Justin Johnson may refer to:
 J. Leroy Johnson (1888–1961), Republican United States Congressman from California
 Justin Johnson (basketball) (born 1996) American basketball player
 Justin Johnson (footballer) (born 1996), Dutch footballer
 Justin Johnson (ice hockey) (born 1981), American ice hockey player
 Justin Johnson (performer) (born 1979), American drag performer, known by his stage name Alyssa Edwards
 Justin Johnson (racing driver) (born 1985), American stock car racing driver
 Justin Johnson (songwriter), American songwriter and producer better known as Count Justice
 Justin Johnson (baseball) (born 1977), American baseball coach

See also 
 Justin Meldal-Johnsen (born 1970), American musician and bassist